Dianic cult may refer to:
the cult of Diana (goddess)
the Cult of Herodias in medieval folklore.
the Witch-cult_hypothesis#Murray in 19th century Romanticism, invented by Margaret Murray.